is a traditional Shinto system of divination. Practitioners attempt to foresee future events by interpreting the pattern of cracks made by heating the shoulder-blade of a stag. The practice is thought to predate the introduction of divination by tortoiseshell, which was imported from China; archaeological evidence suggests it originated as early as the Jōmon period. 

Futomani is still practiced at the Shinto shrine on Mount Mitake as an annual event. 

In aikido, futomani is considered an important adjunct to kotodama practice.

References

See also 
 Glossary of Shinto
 Oracle bones

Shinto
Japanese folk religion
Divination